Robert Scott Adsit (born November 26, 1965) is an American actor, comedian, and writer. Born and raised in the Chicago suburbs, Adsit joined the mainstage cast of Chicago's The Second City in 1994 after attending Columbia College Chicago. He appeared in several revues, including Paradigm Lost for which he won The Joseph Jefferson Award for Best Actor in a Comedy.

From 2005–2008, he co-directed, co-wrote and co-produced the Adult Swim stop-motion animation program Moral Orel with Dino Stamatopoulos and Jay Johnston. He also voiced several characters and was nominated for an Annie Award for his work as Clay Puppington, Orel's father. After the success of Moral Orel, Adsit and Stamatopoulos worked together again on their stop-motion animation series Mary Shelley's Frankenhole. Adult Swim ordered ten episodes for its first season, which began airing June 27, 2010, and was canceled in 2012.

Adsit is known for his role as Pete Hornberger, the well-meaning but jaded producer, on the NBC sitcom 30 Rock, which won a Screen Actors Guild Award for Outstanding Performance by an Ensemble in a Comedy Series in 2008. In 2014, Adsit voiced the robot Baymax in the Disney animated film Big Hero 6, which he reprised in both Big Hero 6: The Series (2017–2021) and the Disney+ series Baymax!.

Early life
Adsit was born in Northbrook, Illinois on November 26, 1965, the son of Genevieve "Genny" (née Butz) and Andrew Scott Adsit, a real estate attorney. He attended Glenbrook North High School, where he recalled being "a bit of a class clown," and attended Indiana's DePauw University for one semester. He then attended Columbia College Chicago, where acting teacher Sheldon Patinkin encouraged him to join the city's famed improv troupe, The Second City.

Career

1987–1998
Adsit joined Second City in 1987, and became part of its mainstage cast in 1994. He appeared in several Joseph Jefferson Award-winning revues, including Piñata Full of Bees and Paradigm Lost for which he won The Jeff Award for Best Actor in a Comedy. A sketch he performed with future Saturday Night Live head writer Adam McKay, "Gump," was included as one of Second City's all-time best in the theater's 25th anniversary compilation. He appeared in the 1997 PBS documentary about the process of creating the Second City review, Paradigm Lost, Second to None along with castmates Tina Fey, Kevin Dorff, Rachel Dratch, Jenna Jolovitz and Jim Zulevic.

In 1996, he portrayed an alcoholic and drug-addicted father in Minnesota's Hazelden Substance Abuse Clinic short-subject production, Reflections From The Heart Of A Child. This 26-minute video/DVD feature has become required curriculum in most DWI Repeat Offender classes and substance abuse rehabilitation clinics across the U.S. 
In 1997, Adsit recorded the voices for the King of Payne, Sir Psycho, The Duke of Bourbon, and Merlin for Williams' Medieval Madness pinball machine. Adsit co-wrote the game's recorded dialog with fellow Second City cast member, Kevin Dorff. Dorff and Tina Fey also played the character voices in the game.

In 1998,  Adsit moved to Los Angeles after an invitation from his college friend Dino Stamatopoulos to work on a pilot about the backstage antics of a television sketch-comedy variety show. The pilot did not materialize as a show, but Adsit stayed in California and began working in bit parts and commercials. That same year, he appeared as a cast member in the renowned sketch comedy program, Mr. Show. He also plagued the band Tenacious D as a neighbor and a demon in their HBO show.

2000s
In 2001, he starred in an episode of Friends, "The One with Ross and Monica's Cousin" in Season 7. 

From 2005–2008, he co-directed, co-wrote and co-produced the Adult Swim show Moral Orel with Stamatopoulos and Jay Johnston. He also provided the voice of Orel's father, Clay Puppington, as well as his best friend, Doughy, Link McMissins, Art Posabule, Mr. Christein, Junior Christein, Doctor Potterswheel, Billy Figurelli, Mrs. Figurelli and Tiny Tina, among others. He was nominated for an Annie Award for his work as Clay. Adsit also had a minor role in The Office episode "Conflict Resolution" as a photographer. Adsit also had a small role in the movie Kicking & Screaming, starring Will Ferrell, where he played the coach of a rival team.

In 2005, he received a call from former Second City castmate Tina Fey. "Tina called and said, 'I'm working on a show, and there's a part I'm writing with you in mind, so keep your schedule open next year.' So I did," Adsit recalled in 2009. In a twist of fate, he also auditioned for Aaron Sorkin's Studio 60 on the Sunset Strip, another series about the behind-the-scenes drama of a variety show. "My manager said, 'There's a good possibility you're going to be offered both of these, so which are you going to go with? You have to tell me now,'" Adsit said. "I said, 'Tina is the lady from Weekend Update that riles a lot of people, and Aaron Sorkin just finished The West Wing; he's the golden boy.'" Ultimately, Adsit picked his friend: "I had to go with somebody I know and respect. I went with Tina."

In 2006, he joined the cast of 30 Rock, Fey's show, as Pete Hornberger, a longtime friend of Fey's character, Liz Lemon, and well-meaning but frequently terrified producer of TGS with Tracy Jordan, a fictitious sketch comedy series. The show ran for seven seasons and was a critical smash, earning 103 Emmy nominations.

In 2007, Adsit starred together with Brendon Small in Let's Fish, a pilot for Adult Swim, but the pilot did not become an official series.

2010s
After the success of Moral Orel, Adsit and Dino Stamatopoulos started working together again on their newest stop-motion animation series Mary Shelley's Frankenhole, which Adult Swim has ordered ten episodes for its first season, which began airing on June 27, 2010. Adsit directed, wrote, produced and provided many of the lead voices. In June 2010, Adsit hosted a panel featuring comic book writers Dan Slott, Frank Tieri, and Chris Claremont at HeroCon in Charlotte, North Carolina. In 2012 a character named Agent Scott Adsit appeared as an agent of S.H.I.E.L.D. in Marvel's Deadpool, and has since become a recurring character in the title.

Adsit also guest starred as the "Guest Bailiff" in three episodes of John Hodgman's podcast Judge John Hodgman. Adsit starred as himself in John Hodgman's Netflix comedy special John Hodgman: Ragnarok.

Adsit voiced the huggable robot Baymax in the 2014 Disney animated film Big Hero 6. Producer Roy Conli said "The fact that his character is a robot limits how you can emote, but Scott was hilarious. He took those boundaries and was able to shape the language in a way that makes you feel Baymax's emotion and sense of humor. Scott was able to relay just how much Baymax cares."

Adsit joined the Season 3 cast of the Adult Swim live-action TV series The Heart, She Holler as the corrupt Sheriff, starring alongside Amy Sedaris. Paste Magazine stated that "Sedaris and Adsit, two relatively new co-stars, have great chemistry".

Adsit plays Sheriff Ridge in Wolverine: The Long Night, a scripted podcast serial.

He also had a recurring role as news anchor Greg Hart in the HBO political sitcom Veep.

Adsit performs live in the show John and Scott with John Lutz and in Adsit and Eveleth with Jet Eveleth.

Adsit continues to act, improvise and teach at I.O. West and the Upright Citizens Brigade.

Filmography

Film

Television

Video games

References

External links

1965 births
20th-century American comedians
21st-century American comedians
20th-century American male actors
21st-century American male actors
Living people
American male comedians
American male film actors
American male television actors
American male television writers
American male voice actors
American sketch comedians
American television directors
American television writers
Columbia College Chicago alumni
Comedians from Illinois
DePauw University alumni
Glenbrook North High School alumni
Male actors from Chicago
People from Northbrook, Illinois
Screenwriters from Illinois
Television producers from Illinois
Upright Citizens Brigade Theater performers